is a train station in Naniwa-ku, Osaka, Osaka Prefecture, Japan, operated by the private railway operator Nankai Electric Railway.

Lines
Shiomibashi Station is the terminus of the Koya Line (Shiomibashi Line), and has the station number "NK06-5".

Layout
The station has an island platform with two tracks.

Adjacent stations

Surrounding area
Sakuragawa Station (Osaka Metro Sennichimae Line, Hanshin Railway Hanshin Namba Line)
Osaka Dome - 1 km away

See also
 List of railway stations in Japan

References

External links

  

Railway stations in Japan opened in 1900
Railway stations in Osaka Prefecture